Mandaravanesvarar Temple is a Siva temple in Manakkal Ayyempet in Nagapattinam district in Tamil Nadu (India).

Vaippu Sthalam
It is one of the shrines of the Vaippu Sthalams sung by Tamil Saivite Nayanar Appar.

Presiding deity
The presiding deity is known as Mandaravanesvarar and Sornapurisvarar. The Goddess is known as Anjanatchi and Angayarkanni.

Speciality
This place is also known as Mandaravanam. Inscriptions of Cholas are found in this temple.

References

Hindu temples in Nagapattinam district
Shiva temples in Nagapattinam district